Kurt Gerrard Luby (born 6 March 1963 in Bolton, Lancashire) is a former British auto racing driver who now works as a motorcycle dealer in his hometown of Bolton. He first entered racing through karting in 1978, winning seven championships up to 1987. In 1987 he won the British Formula Ford 1600 series, winning the championship that year and then defending his title in 1988. He switched to the Formula Vauxhall Lotus Championship in 1989, finishing second on points. A year later he was third in the championship. After moving to saloon car racing, he was second in the 1991  National Saloon Championship Group N, driving a BMW M3. Also that year he won the Willhire 24 Hours with Will Hoy and Ray Bellm. His final championship title was in the 1998 British GT in a GT2 class Chrysler Viper GTS-R alongside Richard Dean.

Luby is best known for his brief time in the British Touring Car Championship. His first year was in 1990, racing for the BMW Junior Team. He drove in seven races with five wins and two-second places in his class, finishing thirteenth in the final standings. His second year in the BTCC didn't come until 2001. He only raced in the first part of the season in a Lexus IS200 for ABG Motorsport, finishing ninth in the championship in what was a small field of drivers.

Racing record

Complete British Touring Car Championship results
(key) (Races in bold indicate pole position - 1 point awarded all races in 2001 only) (Races in italics indicate fastest lap - 1 point awarded - 1 point awarded all races) (* signifies that driver lead feature race for at least one lap - 1 point awarded in 2001 only)

‡ Endurance driver - not eligible for points

Complete British GT Championship results
(key) (Races in bold indicate pole position) (Races in italics indicate fastest lap)

External links
 Official BTCC 2001 Standings.
 BTCCPages Profile.

British Touring Car Championship drivers
1963 births
Living people
People from Bolton]
British GT Championship drivers
BMW M drivers